On June 22/23, 2020, CTBTO radionuclide stations in and near Stockhom, Sweden detected unusually high levels of caesium-134, caesium-137 and ruthenium-103 in and around the Baltic Sea. Observations by the CTBTO and numerous national agencies are on-going, but although the radionuclide levels are elevated, they are not considered to be harmful to public health. TASS reported that the two nuclear plants in northwest Russia, Leningrad Nuclear Power Plant and Kola Nuclear Power Plant, were both operating normally.

External links

References

Radiation accidents and incidents
June 2020 events in Europe